Juan Eduardo Colucho, better known by his stage name Juan Colucho, is an Argentine actor, born in Buenos Aires. He is most recognised for his portrayal of Dave Mejía, the lead character on the W Studios and Lemon Films Studios crime drama series La Piloto. His first major role was in the Televisa drama A que no me dejas.

Television roles

Stage

References

External links 

Argentine male models
Argentine male telenovela actors
21st-century Argentine male actors
Living people
Year of birth missing (living people)